Darine Stern (November 16, 1947 – February 5, 1994) was an American model and the first African-American model featured on the cover of Playboy magazine by herself.

Biography
Stern was the first black woman to appear by herself on the cover of Playboy magazine in the October 1971 issue. 

Her appearance followed Jean Bell who was featured on the magazine's January 1970 cover, though with four other models.

She began her career in the late 1960s as a bank teller and hostess for the Top of the Hancock Building Restaurant. There she acquired various well known admirers and her soon-to-be-husband, David Ray. During the time that she was a bank teller a photographer visiting her bank asked to take her photograph.  Images he took came to the attention of the Playboy editorial team, which resulted in her being chosen to appear on the cover of the magazine.  

After marrying Ray, she settled for a time into the role of being a dentist's wife, and stepmother to Ray's son.  In the course of time, she went to New York City to further her modelling career, and she and Ray divorced.  
   
Following her cover on Playboy, Stern went on to become a high-profile model, being represented by Ford Models, Nina Blanchard, Ellen Harth and Shirley Hamilton Models of Chicago and New York, even doing some European runways. After a short time in Los Angeles, she returned to Chicago to work as a fashion director, image consultant and costume designer. 

She created Darine Stern Agency to foster the careers of emerging models.

She died on February 5, 1994, due to complications of breast cancer.

References

1994 deaths
1947 births
African-American Playboy Playmates
1970s Playboy Playmates
African-American female models
20th-century African-American women
20th-century African-American people
20th-century American people